Trachysomus luederwaldti is a species of beetle in the family Cerambycidae. It was described by Martins in 1975. It is known from Brazil.

References

Onciderini
Beetles described in 1975